Tulpa is a concept in Theosophy, mysticism, and the paranormal, of an object or being that is created through spiritual or mental powers. Modern practitioners, who call themselves "tulpamancers", use the term to refer to a type of willed imaginary friend which practitioners consider to be sentient and relatively independent.

Theosophy and thoughtforms 

20th-century Theosophists adapted the Vajrayana concept of the emanation body into the concepts of 'tulpa' and 'thoughtform'. The Theosophist Annie Besant, in the 1905 book Thought-Forms, divides them into three classes: forms in the shape of the person who creates them, forms that resemble objects or people and may become ensouled by nature spirits or by the dead, and forms that represent inherent qualities from the astral or mental planes, such as emotions. The term 'thoughtform' is also used in Evans-Wentz's 1927 translation of the Tibetan Book of the Dead. The concept is also used in the Western practice of magic. 

Occultist William Walker Atkinson in his book The Human Aura described thoughtforms as simple ethereal objects emanating from the auras surrounding people, generating from their thoughts and feelings. He further elaborated in Clairvoyance and Occult Powers how experienced practitioners of the occult can produce thoughtforms from their auras that serve as astral projections which may or may not look like the person who is projecting them, or as illusions that can only be seen by those with "awakened astral senses".

Alexandra David-Néel

Spiritualist Alexandra David-Néel stated that she had observed these mystical practices in 20th-century Tibet. She described tulpas as "magic formations generated by a powerful concentration of thought." David-Néel believed that a tulpa could develop a mind of its own: "Once the tulpa is endowed with enough vitality to be capable of playing the part of a real being, it tends to free itself from its maker's control. According to  David-Néel, this happens nearly mechanically, just as the child, when her body is completed and able to live apart, leaves its mother's womb." She said she had created such a tulpa in the image of a jolly Friar Tuck-like monk, which later developed a life of its own and had to be destroyed. David-Néel raised the possibility that her experience was illusory: "I may have created my own hallucination", though she said others could see the thoughtforms that she created.

Tulpamancers 
Influenced by depictions in television and cinema from the 1990s and 2000s, the term tulpa started to be used to refer to a type of willed imaginary friend. Practitioners consider tulpas to be sentient and relatively autonomous. Online communities dedicated to tulpas spawned on the 4chan and Reddit websites. These communities refer to tulpa practitioners as "tulpamancers". The communities gained popularity when adult fans of My Little Pony started discussing tulpas of characters from the My Little Pony television series. The fans attempted to use meditation and lucid dreaming techniques to create imaginary friends. 

Surveys by Veissière explored this community's demographic, social, and psychological profiles. These practitioners believe a tulpa is a "real or somewhat-real person". The number of active participants in these online communities is in the low hundreds, and few meetings in person have taken place. They belong to "primarily urban, middle-class, Euro-American adolescent and young adult demographics" and they "cite loneliness and social anxiety as an incentive to pick up the practice". 93.7% of respondents expressed that their involvement with the creation of tulpas has "made their condition better", and led to new unusual sensory experiences. Some practitioners have sexual and romantic interactions with their tulpas, though the practice is controversial and trending toward taboo. One survey found that 8.5% support a metaphysical explanation of tulpas, 76.5% support a neurological or psychological explanation, and 14% "other" explanations.

Practitioners believe tulpas are able to communicate with their host in ways they sense do not originate from their own thoughts. Some practitioners report experiencing hallucinations of their tulpas. Practitioners that have hallucinations report being able to see, hear and touch their tulpas. Veissière's survey of 141 respondents found that the rates of autism, ADD and ADHD is significantly higher among the surveyed tulpamancers than in the general population. He goes on to speculate that people may be more likely to want to make a tulpa because these groups have a higher level of loneliness.

See also

References

External links 
 
 

Hallucinations
New Age
Occult collective consciousness
Paranormal terminology
Theosophical philosophical concepts
Theosophy
Legendary creatures